John Devries may refer to:
John Devries (Yukon politician) (born 1945), a politician in the Yukon, Canada
John DeVries (1915–1992), American lyricist
John de Vries (born 1966), Australian racing driver